The 2023 UC San Diego Tritons men's volleyball team represents the University of California San Diego in the 2023 NCAA Division I & II men's volleyball season. The Tritons, led by first year head coach Brad Rostratter, play their home games at the LionTree Arena. The Tritons compete as members of the Big West Conference and were picked to finish sixth in the Big West preseason poll.

Preseason

Coaches poll 
The preseason poll was released on December 21, 2022. UC San Diego was picked to finish last in the Big West Conference standings.

Roster

Schedule
TV/Internet Streaming/Radio information:
ESPN+ will carry all home and conference road games. All other road broadcasts will be carried by the schools respective streaming partner. 

 *-Indicates conference match.
 Times listed are Pacific Time Zone.

Announcers for televised games

Loyola Chicago: Ray Gooden & Henry Payne 
Lewis: Allie Lankowicz & Hannah Alvey
Emmanuel: Bryan Fenley & Ricci Luyties
Menlo: Bryan Fenley & Ricci Luyties
UCLA: 
Erskine: 
Grand Canyon: 
Ottawa: 
USC: 
Westcliff: 
Concordia Irvine: 
CSUN: 
UC Santa Barbara: 
Ball State: 
UC Irvine: 
UC Irvine: 
CSUN: 
Long Beach State: 
Long Beach State: 
UC Santa Barbara: 
Hawai'i: 
Hawai'i: 
Big West Tournament:

Rankings 

^The Media did not release a Pre-season or Week 1 poll.

References

2023 in sports in California
2023 NCAA Division I & II men's volleyball season
UC San Diego